The orange-fringed largemouth (Chetia brevis), also known as the orange-fringed river bream, is a species of haplochromine cichlid native to Mozambique and South Africa.  It occurs in the Komati River system in South Africa as well as in coastal lakes of Mozambique.  It inhabits quiet waters with marginal vegetation and sandy substrates.  This species can reach a length of  SL. Iy is threatened with invasive species and alteration of its habitat.

References

brevis
Fish described in 1968
Cichlid fish of Africa
Taxonomy articles created by Polbot